Mitchell Power Plant is a large coal fired power station located on West Virginia Route 2 south of Moundsville, West Virginia, United States.

This smokestack was once the tallest in the world for a short period of time.  it is the sixth tallest, and still the tallest freestanding structure in the Southern United States. 

A second 1,000 foot tall smokestack was built in 2006 to comply with emission regulations. On March 6, a fire broke out at the top of the new stack trapping several construction workers just as they were finishing the installation of the stack's fiberglass liner. Three of the workers were rescued by helicopter evacuation; a fourth worker at the site, Gerald Talbert, died from the accident.

See also

List of chimneys
List of towers
List of tallest freestanding structures in the world

References

External links

 Diagram of Mitchell Power Plant Chimney

Energy infrastructure completed in 1971
Towers completed in 1971
FirstEnergy
Buildings and structures in Marshall County, West Virginia
Coal-fired power stations in West Virginia
Towers in West Virginia
Chimneys in the United States
Moundsville, West Virginia